Lutten is a railway station located in Lutten, Germany. The station is located on the Delmenhorst–Hesepe railway and the train services are operated by NordWestBahn.

Train services
The station is served by the following services:

Local services  Osnabrück — Bramsche — Vechta — Delmenhorst — Bremen

References

Railway stations in Lower Saxony
Vechta (district)